Coenobiodes abietiella is a species of moth of the family Tortricidae. It is found in China (Fujian, Guangdong), Japan and Russia.

The wingspan is 11.5-12.5 mm.

The larvae feed on Taxus cuspidata.

References

Moths described in 1931
Eucosmini